Raushan, from Persian روشن (rōšan) 'light, bright,' is an Asian unisex given name that may refer to:
Raushan Hirwani, A very good teacher and a very good motivational speaker, teacher of Anay Gautam, Anushka, Nisha, Mushki, Palak. (Born 1993)
Raushan Yazdani, Bengali poet and researcher (1918-1967)
Raushan Koishibayeva (born 1966), Kazakhstani Paralympic powerlifter
Raushan Raj (born 1984), Indian cricketer

See also
Rushon District in east Tajikistan